Gramsbergen (Dutch Low Saxon: Grambarge) is a small Dutch city on the Vechte, located in the municipality of Hardenberg and the province of Overijssel. The town is located on corridors of different transportation modes: The N34 (Zwolle - Emmen), the Zwolle - Emmen railway and the Almelo - de Haandrik canal.

History
Gramsbergen and its hamlets have been inhabited since pre-historic times. In the 'Cultuur Historisch Informatie Centrum Vechtdal' (The Historical and Cultural Center of Vechtdal), in the centre of Gramsbergen, several archaeological artefacts are exhibited. These artefacts come from settlements from around 8000 BC.

It was first mentioned in 1227 as Bergene, and means "the hill of Gram (person)". It received city rights in 1442.

Gramsbergen developed on higher ground along the Vechte. In 1227, the Battle of Ane was fought to the west of Gramsbergen during which the bishop of Utrecht was defeated by the citizens of Drenthe. In 1339, a havezate, was built which developed into a castle. In 1673, it was taken by the Prince-Bishopric of Münster. The castle was destroyed in 1674 by the Dutch States Army to prevent Münster from threatening Coevorden. The city did not develop in its later history and remained relatively small. In 1840, it was home to 526 people.

Since 1 January 2001, Gramsbergen has been part of Hardenberg.

Transportation
Railway Station: Gramsbergen

Notable citizens
 Henk Bodewitz (born 1939), Sanskrit scholar and professor
 Erik Hulzebosch (born 1970), marathon speed skater, inline speed skater and part-time singer and blogger 
 Albert Timmer (born 1985), professional road bicycle racer

Gallery

References

External links

Municipalities of the Netherlands disestablished in 2001
Populated places in Overijssel
Former municipalities of Overijssel
Hardenberg